John Burkel (born April 6, 1967) is an American politician serving in the Minnesota House of Representatives since 2021. A member of the Republican Party of Minnesota, Burkel represents District 1A in northwest Minnesota, which includes the city of Thief River Falls and parts of Kittson, Roseau, Marshall, and Pennington Counties.

Early life, education, and career
Burkel grew up in Greenbush, Minnesota, and attended Greenbush High School. He is a fourth-generation farmer. He attended North Dakota State University for two years to pursue a degree in business and economics but dropped out to work at his family's turkey farm.

President Barack Obama pardoned Popcorn, a turkey belonging to Burkel, in the 2013 National Thanksgiving Turkey Presentation. He was vice chairman of the National Turkey Federation. During a 2015 outbreak of avian flu, Burkel testified to the Minnesota Legislature about the flu's impact on turkey farmers.

Minnesota House of Representatives
Burkel was elected to the Minnesota House of Representatives in 2020 and was reelected in 2022. He first ran after five-term Republican incumbent Dan Fabian announced he would not seek reelection and encouraged Burkel to run.

Burkel serves on the Agriculture Finance and Policy and Environment and Natural Resources Finance and Policy Committees and the Property Taxes Division of the Taxes Committee.

In 2022 after an outbreak of bird-flu, Burkel spoke in support of passing emergency funding. In response to legislation to limit the movement of farmed deer to prevent the spread of chronic wasting disease, Burkel advocated for the state to compensate farmers for their financial losses. Burkel has argued that the government's support of ethanol has harmed livestock farmers who use corn for feed.

Burkel and Representative Deb Kiel introduced bills increasing vocational education for high school students. He also introduced legislation that would reform county engineer residency laws so rural counties could find one easier. Burkel spoke against mask mandates during the COVID-19 pandemic.

Electoral history

Personal life
Burkel lives in Badger, Minnesota with his wife, Joni, and has five children. He is Catholic.

References

External links

 Official House of Representatives website
 Official campaign website

1967 births
Living people
People from Roseau County, Minnesota
North Dakota State University alumni
Republican Party members of the Minnesota House of Representatives
21st-century American politicians